Roberto Pedraza Martínez (born 1 May 1952) is a Mexican politician affiliated with the Institutional Revolutionary Party. As of 2014 he served as Deputy of the LIX Legislature of the Mexican Congress representing Hidalgo. He was also Municipal President of Ixmiquilpan from 1991 to 1994.

References

1952 births
Living people
Politicians from Hidalgo (state)
Institutional Revolutionary Party politicians
People from Ixmiquilpan
Members of the Congress of Hidalgo
20th-century Mexican politicians
21st-century Mexican politicians
Deputies of the LIX Legislature of Mexico
Members of the Chamber of Deputies (Mexico) for Hidalgo (state)